Anton Friedrich Josef Schütz (April 19, 1894 in Berndorf (Rhine-Province/Kingdom of Prussia/German Empire) – October 6, 1977 in New- York, USA) was a German-American artist and founder of the New York Graphic Society. Examples of his work can be found in the Smithsonian and the Uffizi.

Sources
http://siris-archives.si.edu/ipac20/ipac.jsp?uri=full=3100001~!210767~!0&term=
https://web.archive.org/web/20060901171335/http://www.washjeff.edu/german/antonschutz/ 
 Anton Schütz

American printmakers
1894 births
1977 deaths
German emigrants to the United States